The Christ the Saviour Cathedral  also called Cathedral of Jesus Saviour is a religious building that is affiliated with the Catholic Church and is located at 100 Sanmin street in Central District, Taichung, Taiwan, Island. The present church building began in 1957 and was completed in 1958.

The temple follows the Roman or Latin rite and serves as the principal church of the Catholic Diocese of Taichung (Dioecesis Taichungensis or 天主教台中教區) which was created in 1962 by Pope John XXIII by the Bull "Cum Deo iuvante".

The church is under the pastoral responsibility of the Bishop Martin Su Yao-wen.

See also
Roman Catholicism in Taiwan
Christ the Saviour Cathedral

References

Roman Catholic cathedrals in Taiwan
Buildings and structures in Taichung
Roman Catholic churches completed in 1958
20th-century Roman Catholic church buildings